Willie Horton (born William Wattison Horton, October 18, 1942) is a former left fielder and designated hitter in Major League Baseball who played primarily for the Detroit Tigers. Over an eighteen-year career spanning six American League teams he was a four-time All-Star and won a World Championship with the 1968 Tigers.  He hit 20 or more home runs seven times, and his 325 career home runs ranked sixth among AL right-handed hitters when he retired. He enjoyed his best season in 1968, finishing second in the AL with 36 homers, a .543 slugging average and 278 total bases. In the later years of his career he was twice named the AL's top designated hitter.

Early years
Horton is the youngest of 14 children of James Horton and his wife Lillian (Wattison) Horton. He was born in Arno, Virginia, a small community in the corporate limits of Appalachia, Virginia.  He hit a home run at Tiger Stadium at 16 years old during an all-city high school game.  After winning a city championship with Detroit Northwestern High School in 1959 he signed with the Tigers in 1961, playing for the Tigers' farm team, the Duluth Dukes, on the shores of Lake Superior.

Detroit Tigers
Horton made his debut with the Detroit Tigers on September 10, 1963.  He hit a pinch-hit home run off Robin Roberts in his second at bat. He saw limited playing time in his first two years before his official rookie campaign in 1965, in which he finished second in the AL with 104 runs batted in (RBI) and third with 29 home runs. He was named to the All-Star team, and placed eighth in the MVP balloting. Becoming known for his bulging forearms and tremendous strength, he again reached 100 RBIs in the 1966 season. During the 1967 Detroit 12th Street riot, he tried bravely to restore peace. He stood in his Tiger uniform on a car in the middle of the chaos, pleading for calm. However, despite his impassioned pleas, the city burned for five more days.

Horton posted double-digit home run totals in 12 regular seasons from 1965 to 1976, and hit two home runs in a game on 30 occasions. He had a career-high 36 home runs in 1968, a pitcher's year in which Detroit won the World Series; he finished second in the AL to Frank Howard in homers, slugging and total bases. In a year in which the league batting average was .230 and Carl Yastrzemski won the batting title with a .301 mark, Horton's .285 average was good for fourth in the AL. He finished fourth in the MVP voting.

He also batted .304 in the World Series against the St. Louis Cardinals that year. In order to combine Horton's offensive power with a good defense, manager Mayo Smith moved regular center fielder Mickey Stanley to shortstop as a replacement for Ray Oyler, who was benched because of his paltry .135 batting average. He kept Al Kaline, a routine Gold Glove Award winner, in right field and put Jim Northrup in center field; the two had platooned in right field for much of the year. When the Tigers were safely ahead, Oyler would replace Stanley at shortstop, batting in Horton's lineup spot; Stanley returned to center field, and Northrup would move over to replace Horton in left field. In Game 2, Horton had a solo home run to give the Tigers an early 1–0 lead, and they won 8–1. While not considered a great defensive outfielder, he made a pivotal play in the fifth inning of Game 5. With the Cardinals leading the Series 3–1 and the game 3–2, Lou Brock doubled with one out. He tried to score on Julián Javier's single, but chose not to slide; Horton's throw reached catcher Bill Freehan on one bounce to beat Brock on a close play. Horton still lists the throw as the most memorable moment of his career. Detroit scored three runs in the seventh inning to win 5–3, and went on to win Games 6 and 7 as well; Horton had two runs and two RBI in the 13–1 blowout in Game 6, and two hits and a run in the final 4–1 victory.

Horton was a four-time member of the AL All-Star team (1965, 1968, 1970 and 1973). On July 18, 1969, playing against the Cleveland Indians, he tied Boston Braves outfielder Earl Clark's record for most put outs in a nine inning game by a left fielder, nine, a record that has since been tied by Jacoby Ellsbury of the Boston Red Sox. He hit three home runs against the Milwaukee Brewers on June 9, 1970. On April 14, 1974, he hit a popup which struck and killed a pigeon at Fenway Park. He was named the AL's Outstanding Designated Hitter in 1975 after hitting 25 home runs with 92 RBI.

In 1970, in a game in Milwaukee against the Brewers, Horton saved fellow Tiger Al Kaline’s life, after Kaline collided with outfielder Jim Northrup.  Horton rushed over and recognizing that Kaline was turning blue, pried open his team-mate's jaw and cleared his airway.

Texas Rangers
After being supplanted as left fielder by Steve Kemp and designated hitter by Rusty Staub, Horton was traded from the Tigers to the Texas Rangers for Steve Foucault on April 12, 1977. He again hit three home runs in a 7–3 win over the Kansas City Royals at Royals Stadium one month later on May 15. He spent 1978 playing for the Cleveland Indians, Oakland Athletics and Toronto Blue Jays, traded there along with Phil Huffman from the Athletics to the Toronto Blue Jays for former batting champion and top DH Rico Carty on August 15, 1978.  He played with the Seattle Mariners from 1979 to 1980.

Navegantes del Magallanes
In 1978, he joined the Venezuelan team Navegantes del Magallanes as a designated hitter and manager. In his first season with Magallanes, Horton earned the nickname "El Brujo" ("The Wizard"), taking the team from last place the previous season to first, winning the 1979 Caribbean Series championship with a 5–1 record.

Seattle Mariners
In 1979 with the Mariners he was again named the AL's Outstanding Designated Hitter after hitting .279 with 29 HR and a career-high 106 RBI, and he received The Sporting News Comeback Player of the Year Award as well. On June 5, against the Tigers against John Hiller, he hit what seemed to be his 300th career home run, but it struck a speaker hanging from the roof of the Kingdome and bounced onto the field for a single; he would collect number 300 the next day against Jack Morris. His Mariners record of 106 RBI was broken by Alvin Davis in 1984, his marks of 180 hits and 296 total bases were broken by Phil Bradley in 1985, and his record of 29 home runs was broken by Gorman Thomas in 1985. His record of 646 at bats was broken by Alex Rodriguez in 1998; Horton remains one of only four Mariners to have played the full 162 games in a season. He played his final major league game on October 5, 1980. He was traded back to the Rangers from the Mariners along with Rick Honeycutt, Leon Roberts, Mario Mendoza and Larry Cox for Richie Zisk, Jerry Don Gleaton, Rick Auerbach, Ken Clay, Brian Allard and minor-league right-handed pitcher Steve Finch in an 11-player blockbuster deal on December 18, 1980. Horton played two more years in the Pacific Coast League and another season in Mexican baseball.

Retirement

In an 18-season career, Horton posted a .273 batting average and .457 slugging average with 1993 hits, 284 doubles, 1,163 RBIs, 873 runs and 20 stolen bases in 2028 games. His 325 home runs in the AL placed him behind only Harmon Killebrew (573), Jimmie Foxx (524), teammate Al Kaline (399), Rocky Colavito (371) and Joe DiMaggio (361) among right-handed hitters.

Among his baseball superstitions was his use of the same batting helmet throughout his career; he repainted it when he changed teams. After retiring, he coached for the New York Yankees and Chicago White Sox. On July 15, 2000 Horton became just the sixth former player given the ultimate honor by the Detroit Tigers; a statue of Horton was placed in Comerica Park and his number 23 was retired, joining a select group that includes former Tigers players Ty Cobb (who played before uniforms had numbers), Charlie Gehringer (number 2), Hank Greenberg (number 5), Al Kaline (number 6), and Hal Newhouser (number 16). While Horton's career body of work was not of the same Hall of Fame caliber as that of his Tiger brethren enshrined in Cooperstown, his statue is a testament to the strong character he displayed on and off the field, and the crucial role he played in restoring peace and quelling eruptions during the 1967 race riot.  To this day his legacy endures as an important symbol of peace and harmony in a hardscrabble city often beset by racial tension.

Since 2003, Horton has served as a Special Assistant to Tigers President/CEO/General Manager, originally Dave Dombrowski, and now Al Avila. Former Tigers teammate Al Kaline also held this position, and the two threw out the first pitch of the 2006 World Series at Comerica Park.

For the ninth consecutive year, the state of Michigan recognized one man's ability to overcome obstacles and achieve a lifetime of success when "Willie Horton Day" was celebrated on Thursday, October 18, 2012. Horton is the fourth person in Michigan history to be given a day, with the third being Rosa Parks.

On Opening Day 2013, Horton threw out the first pitch at Comerica Park in Detroit. The Tigers went on to win 8–3 over the New York Yankees.

See also

 List of Major League Baseball career home run leaders
 List of Major League Baseball career runs batted in leaders

Notes

References

Further reading
 Jet staff (January 23, 1969). "Officially Willie". Jet. p. 57
 Ebony staff (September 1968). "Can Willie Horton Survive?". Ebony. pp. 103–106, 108, 110
 Brosnan, Jim (September 1976). "The Designated Hitter: Baseball's New Hero". Boy's Life. pp. 24–26
 Jet staff (July 8, 1985). "Ex-Tiger Becomes Yankees' Tranquility Coach". Jet. p. 50
 Jet staff (1989). "Ex-Tiger Gets Detroit PAL Post". Jet. p. 27
 Roose, Bill L. (May 27, 1999). "Horton's Roof Shot Set the Stadium's Prep Standard". Detroit Free Press. pp. 9D, 12D

External links

Willie Horton at SABR (Biography BioProject)
Willie Horton at Pura Pelota (Venezuelan Professional Baseball League)

1942 births
Living people
African-American baseball coaches
African-American baseball players
American expatriate baseball players in Canada
American League All-Stars
American sportsmen
Baseball players from Detroit
Baseball players from Virginia
Caribbean Series managers
Chicago White Sox coaches
Cleveland Indians players
Detroit Tigers players
Duluth-Superior Dukes players
Knoxville Smokies players
Major League Baseball designated hitters
Major League Baseball left fielders
Major League Baseball players with retired numbers
Minor league baseball managers
Navegantes del Magallanes players
American expatriate baseball players in Venezuela
New York Yankees coaches
Oakland Athletics players
People from Appalachia, Virginia
Portland Beavers players
Seattle Mariners players
Syracuse Chiefs players
Tecolotes de Nuevo Laredo players
Texas Rangers players
Toronto Blue Jays players
Northwestern High School (Michigan) alumni
American expatriate baseball players in Mexico
21st-century African-American people
20th-century African-American sportspeople